Justice Fraser or Justice Frazer may refer to:

Franklin D. Fraser (1819–1879), associate justice of the Florida Supreme Court
Thomas B. Fraser (1860–1925), associate justice of the South Carolina Supreme Court
Robert S. Frazer (1849–1936), associate justice of the Supreme Court of Pennsylvania
William C. Frazer (1776–1838), associate justice of the Wisconsin Territorial Supreme Court